The 2011 Glava Tour of Norway was the first edition of the Glava Tour of Norway cycle race. It formed part of the 2011 UCI Europe Tour.

Teams

Stages

Jerseys day by day

Stage results

Wednesday 1. June – 1. stage: Tønsberg  – Larvik, 173 km

Thursday 2. June – 2. stage: Skien     – Drammen, 173 km

Friday 3. June – 3. stage: Sarpsborg – Halden, 174 km

Saturday 4. June – 4. stage: Jessheim  – Hamar, 194 km

Sunday 5. June – 5. stage: Hamar     – Lillestrøm, 177 km

Webpages
 

Tour of Norway
Tour of Norway
2011 in Norwegian sport